Ustje is a village in the Vipava Valley south of Ajdovščina in the traditional Inner Carniola region of Slovenia. It is now generally regarded as part of the Slovenian Littoral.

Name
The name Ustje is derived from the common noun ustje 'river mouth', referring to the location where Jovšček Creek joins the Vipava River. Some sources also claim that the name may originate from Saint Justus, to whom the parish church in the settlement was dedicated in 1766; however, this is linguistically unlikely. Compare also Ustje in the Municipality of Ig.

History
The oldest monument in the village is the 17th-century church, built on a small hill dedicated to John the Evangelist. Ruins of walls indicate that the site must have been used as a fortification during Ottoman raids.

On August 8, 1942, Italian soldiers of the Julia division killed eight people and burned down the village. After the war, the village was rebuilt and August 8 is observed as a memorial day. The events from 1942 are described in Danilo Lokar's book Sodni dan na vasi (Doomsday in the Village).

Mass grave
Ustje is the site of a mass grave associated with the Second World War. The Ajdov Field Mass Grave is located in a meadow and a field 110 m south of a waste treatment facility, between a field road and Hubelj Creek. In March 2002, investigators disinterred 67 skeletons from the site, identified as the remains of 15 German and 52 Italian soldiers.

References

External links 
 Ustje at Geopedia
 Detailed description of the events of August 8, 1942 (English version)

Populated places in the Municipality of Ajdovščina